Luis De la Cruz y Goyeneche (Concepción, Reino de Chile, 25 August 1768 –† Santiago de Chile, 1828) was a Chilean politician and military, son of Pablo De la Cruz and Antonia de Goyeneche y Lope de Lara. His father was born in Tabernas (Spain) in 1714 and was a military who  came to Chile in 1740.

He married Josefa Prieto and their son (of five) José María de la Cruz Prieto would also have an important military career.

In 1806 he found and explored the shortest way from Concepción, Chile to Buenos Aires.

He began later his military career during the Chilean War of Independence and participated in several battles and he replaced Bernardo O'Higgins in some occasions.

Ruring the Reconquista, the re-occupation of Chile by the royalist Spanish forces 1814-17, he was held prisoner in the Juan Fernández Islands and freed in 1817 after the Battle of Chacabuco.

External links
 Rodovid alberga la genealogía de Luis De la Cruz
 Biblioteca del Congreso Nacional de Chile Ficha parlamentaria - Luis De la Cruz Goyeneche

1768 births
1828 deaths
Members of the Chamber of Deputies of Chile
Explorers of Chile
Chilean Army generals
People from Concepción, Chile
People of the Chilean War of Independence